Abbott Mead Vickers BBDO (AMV BBDO) is an advertising agency that works with over 85 brands, including BT, Diageo, Walkers, and Mars. AMV campaigns may incorporate digital, social, experiential, print or broadcast media.

AMV is part of the BBDO network, the third largest agency network in the world and part of the Omnicom Group.

Company Overview
AMV's in-house capability includes: community management, data analysis, video content production, live event management and brand partnerships.

AMV has produced several award-winning campaigns, including Guinness ‘surfer’ and more recent work:
 Walkers Sandwich
 Snickers 'You're not you when you're hungry'
 The National Lottery '#'

In August 2016, the agency lost the Sainsbury's account, that it had held for 35 years, to Wieden+Kennedy.

Recent Work
Additionally, their work with Bodyform gained media attention as well as Mog's Christmas Calamity.

Team
Alex Grieve is Executive Creative Director and Sarah Douglas is CEO.

History
AMV was founded by David Abbott (1938-2014), Peter Mead, and Adrian Vickers.

References

Abbott Mead Vickers BBDO launches social media unit, Anne Cassidy, 17 March 2011, Campaign.
AMV launches specialist data analytics arm, Anne Cassidy, 14 July 2011, Campaign.

External links

Advertising agencies of the United Kingdom